Lenehan is a given name and a surname which may refer to:

Surname
Charlie Lenehan (born 1998), British rapper
Ciarán Lenehan, Irish Gaelic footballer
Jim Lenehan (1938–2022), Australian rugby player
Joseph Lenehan (1916–1981), Irish politician
Nancy Lenehan (born 1953), American actress
Patrick Lenehan (1898–1981), Irish boxer
Susan Lenehan (born 1943), Australian politician

See also
 Lenihan

Surnames of Irish origin